Saskia Santer (born 5 December 1977) is an Italian biathlete. She competed at the 2002 Winter Olympics and the 2006 Winter Olympics.

Cross-country skiing results
All results are sourced from the International Ski Federation (FIS).

World Cup

Season standings

References

External links
 

1977 births
Living people
Biathletes at the 2002 Winter Olympics
Biathletes at the 2006 Winter Olympics
Italian female biathletes
Olympic biathletes of Italy
Italian female cross-country skiers
Place of birth missing (living people)